The 1968–69 season was Swindon Town's third consecutive season in the Football League Third Division after relegation from Division Two in 1965. In what proved to be a historic season for Swindon as the club won its first major piece of silverware, the League Cup, beating Arsenal by three goals to one. Swindon Town also won promotion to Division Two and competed in the FA Cup.

Third Division

Matchday squads

Division Three line-ups 

1 1st Substitution

F.A. Cup line-ups 

1 1st Substitution.

League Cup line-ups 

1 1st Substitution.

Appearances

Last updated 18 August 2014

|-
|}

References 

1968-69
English football clubs 1968–69 season